Poddutoori Ganga Reddy  (7 June 1933 – 3 January 2008) was an Indian politician and was Member of Parliament of India. He was a member of the 4th and 5th Lok Sabhas. Reddy represented the Adilabad constituency of Andhra Pradesh (now in Telangana) and was a member of the Congress political party. He died on 3 January 2008

Early life and education
Poddutoori Ganga Reddy was born in the village Torath, Nizamabad in the state of Andhra Pradesh. He attended the Osmania University and attained B.A & LL.B degrees. By profession, Reddy was an Agriculturist.

Political career
Poddutoori Ganga Reddy was M.P. from Adilabad constituency for two straight terms. He was also the Chairman of Zila Parishad in Adilabad district.

Posts Held

https://resultuniversity.com/election/nirmal-andhra-pradesh-assembly-constituencyhttps://entranceindia.com/election-and-politics/shri-poddutoori-ganga-reddy-member-of-parliament-mp-from-adilabad-andhra-pradesh-biodata/

Parliament of India
Politics of India
Zila Parishad

References

1933 births
2017 deaths
India MPs 1967–1970
India MPs 1971–1977
Indian National Congress politicians from Andhra Pradesh
Lok Sabha members from Andhra Pradesh
People from Adilabad district
People from Adilabad